Michel Matthew Ter-Pogossian (April 21, 1925June 19, 1996) was an American medical physicist. He was professor of radiology at the Washington University School of Medicine for over 30 years. A pioneer in nuclear medicine, he is best known for his research on the positron emission tomography (PET). He is considered one of its creators and often referred to as the "father of PET."

Early life
Ter-Pogossian was born on April 21, 1925 in Berlin to Armenian parents from the Ottoman Empire that escaped the Armenian genocide. He was the only child. His family later moved to France, where Ter-Pogossian grew up. He developed an early interest in science and experimented with toy physics and chemistry kits as a child. Ter-Pogossian attended the University of Paris, from which he received his bachelor's degree in mathematics in 1942 or 1943. He subsequently studied at the Institute of Radium under Irène Joliot-Curie, graduating in 1946. He was active in the French Resistance during World War II.

Career
Ter-Pogossian moved to the United States in 1946 to complete his studies. He preferred the US over Britain because the former seemed "more exciting." He enrolled at Washington University in St. Louis as a graduate student in 1946. He was drawn to the university by and studied under Arthur Compton, who was also the university's chancellor at the time. He simultaneously worked in the physics department as a research assistant. Ter-Pogossian received his master's degree in 1948, and his Ph.D. in nuclear physics from Washington University in 1950.

He joined the Mallinckrodt Institute of Radiology at Washington University in 1950. In the same year he also joined the faculty of Washington University School of Medicine as an Instructor in Radiation Physics. He was named professor of radiation physics in 1961, Professor of Biophysics in Physiology in 1964, and Professor of Radiation Sciences in 1973.

Between 1963 and 1991 Ter-Pogossian served as Director of the Division of Radiation Sciences at the Mallinckrodt Institute. After resigning from administrative duties in 1990, Ter-Pogossian devoted all his time to research. He was a self-proclaimed "research junkie". He became emeritus professor in 1995.

Work
Ter-Pogossian spent his entire professional career at Washington University's Mallinckrodt Institute of Radiology. His research focused on "increasing the number of practical clinical applications of cerebral scanning." His work resulted in improvement of medical imaging, radiation therapy, and brachytherapy. He developed a new type of nuclear medicine gamma camera, known as the "Ter-Pogossian camera."

In 1951 Ter-Pogossian developed a pioneering scanner that detected radioactivity concentrations in living material. In the mid-1950s he "reported the first biomedical application of a sodium iodide detector for the diagnosis and localization of intracranial tumors."

Positron emission tomography (PET)
Ter-Pogossian was a pioneer in the use of cyclotron-produced radioactive tracers. He is best known for his work on the positron emission tomography (PET). His research began in the 1950s with a series of experiments that made PET a "practical diagnostic tool" by the 1970s.

His early work led to the installation of a small biomedical cyclotron in the basement at the Washington University Medical Center in 1963. He persuaded several government agencies to support the research. It was the first cyclotron in the US located in a medical center. The cyclotron produced short-lived, positron-emitting radionuclides intended to be used to develop techniques for measuring regional cerebral blood flow, oxygen metabolism, blood volume, and glucose metabolism. The first PET unit was created in 1974 by the group led by Ter-Pogossian. A decade later, PET units of that design were "used in many medical centers throughout the world."

Ter-Pogossian is recognized to have "led the research that turned the positron emission tomography (PET) scanner from an intriguing concept to a medical tool used in hospitals and laboratories everywhere." With Edward J. Hoffman and Michael E. Phelps "he played a major role turning positron imaging from a laboratory concept into practical imaging protocols and devices that are currently used worldwide."

Personal life and death
Ter-Pogossian married visual artist Ann Dodson (née Scott), of St. Louis, in 1966. Ann (1932–2022) had a Master's Degree in Egyptology and participated in exhibitions from 1973 to 2003, including the prestigious Florence Biennale. After her marriage to Michel, she signed her work and exhibited under the name Ann Ter-Pogossian. Ann had two sons and a daughter by her first marriage. The Ter-Pogossians were residents of Clayton, Missouri. 

Ter-Pogossian was described by Ronald G. Evens as a "citizen of the world." He traveled extensively and was a gourmet and a scuba diver. He died on June 19, 1996 of apparent myocardial infarction in Paris, while on a vacation.

Recognition
Ter-Pogossian was an "internationally known pioneer in the use of cyclotron-produced radionuclides in biomedical research." Frans Wackers noted that he is "widely recognized as one of the fathers of PET imaging." He has been called "the father of PET" by some. Ter-Pogossian emphasized that PET is the product of teamwork and elaborated:

Awards
Paul C. Aebersold Award, Society of Nuclear Medicine and Molecular Imaging (1976)
Georg Charles de Hevesy Nuclear Medicine Pioneer Award, Society of Nuclear Medicine and Molecular Imaging (1985)
Canada Gairdner International Award (1993) "For contributions to the development and application of positron emission tomography"

Membership
Ter-Pogossian was a member of many professional societies: charter member of the American Nuclear Society, fellow of the American Physical Society, honorary fellow of the American College of Radiology, Institute of Medicine (elected in 1987).

He was a trustee of the Academy of Science, St. Louis and served as an adviser to several Department of Energy, National Institutes of Health and Food and Drug Administration committees. He served on the editorial boards of several journals, including the American Journal of Roentgenology, the Journal of Nuclear Medicine, and the Journal de Biophysique & Médecine Nucléaire. He was the first editor of the IEEE Transactions on Medical Imaging, published by the Institute of Electrical and Electronics Engineers.

References
Notes

Citations

1925 births
1996 deaths
20th-century American inventors
American people of Armenian descent
20th-century American physicists
Businesspeople from Berlin
French emigrants to the United States
Washington University in St. Louis faculty
Scientists from St. Louis
Physicists from Missouri
Washington University physicists
Members of the National Academy of Medicine
Fellows of the American Physical Society